KCEY may refer to:

 KLOC, a radio station licensed to Turlock, California, USA which previously used the call sign KCEY 
 Murray-Calloway County Airport